The 2022–23 season is the 114th season in the existence of Borussia Dortmund and the club's 47th consecutive season in the top flight of German football. In addition to the domestic league, they are participating in this season's editions of the DFB-Pokal and UEFA Champions League.

The season is the first since 2007–08 without Marcel Schmelzer, who retired after the 2021–22 campaign.

Players

First team squad

Out on loan

Transfers

In

Out

Pre-season and friendlies

Pre-season

Mid-season

Club vs Country

Competitions

Overall record

Bundesliga

League table

Results summary

Results by round

Matches
The league fixtures were announced on 17 June 2022.

DFB-Pokal

UEFA Champions League

Group stage

The group stage draw was held on 25 August 2022.

Knockout phase

Round of 16

Statistics

Appearances and goals

|-
! colspan=16 style=background:#dcdcdc; text-align:center| Goalkeepers

|-
! colspan=16 style=background:#dcdcdc; text-align:center| Defenders

 

|-
! colspan=16 style=background:#dcdcdc; text-align:center| Midfielders

|-
! colspan=16 style=background:#dcdcdc; text-align:center| Forwards

|-
! colspan=16 style=background:#dcdcdc; text-align:center| Players transferred out during the season

Goalscorers

Last updated: 18 March 2023

References

Borussia Dortmund seasons
Borussia Dortmund
Borussia Dortmund